Dichomeris castellana is a moth of the family Gelechiidae. It is found in Spain.

Literature 
First description: Schmidt, A. (1941): New Spanish microlepidoptera. - Boletín de la Real Sociedad Española de Historia Natural 38: 37-39

References

Moths described in 1941
castellana